Gibbet Hill may refer to:

Gibbet Hill (County Wexford), a summit and marilyn in Ireland
Gibbet Hill (Massachusetts), a summit in the United States
Gibbet Hill (University of Warwick), a university campus in Warwickshire, England
Gibbet Hill, Hindhead, a summit in Surrey, England

See also
 Gibbett Hill Formation, Eastern Newfoundland, Canada
 Gibbet Mill (disambiguation)